The United States Post Office building in Scappoose, Oregon, is the current post office serving the local community (as of 2016) and a recognized historic structure. Built in 1966, it is an essentially intact example of the "Thousand Series" facilities built under the direction of the Post Office Department in the late 1950s and the 1960s. These buildings, mostly of a modest, Modern style, represent one component of an evolutionary period in post office design between the PWA-led monumental buildings of the Great Depression and the 1971 reorganization of postal services. This period was marked by rapid growth, technological change, and decreased Congressional support for funding new construction.

The building was entered on the National Register of Historic Places in 2017.

See also
National Register of Historic Places listings in Columbia County, Oregon

Notes

References

Scappoose, Oregon
Buildings and structures in Columbia County, Oregon
National Register of Historic Places in Columbia County, Oregon
Post office buildings on the National Register of Historic Places in Oregon
Modern Movement architecture in the United States
1966 establishments in Oregon